Joseph Davey Cunningham, (b. Scotland, 9 June 1812, died 28 February 1851) was the author of the book History of the Sikhs (1849) and an authority in Punjab University.  His father was the Scottish poet and author Allan Cunningham and his brother was the archaeologist Sir Alexander Cunningham.

At an early age he was reported to have shown such an aptitude for mathematics that his father was advised to send him to Cambridge. However, since he desired to become a soldier, a cadetship in the British East India Company's service was procured for him, through the good offices of Sir Walter Scott. After a reported brilliant career at Addiscombe Military Academy (London Borough of Croydon, England), he sailed for India in 1834.

He was first employed on the staff of the chief engineer of Bengal Presidency in 1834. In 1837, he was appointed assistant to Colonel Claude Wade, the political agent on the Sikh Empire. For the next eight years he held and occupied several political positions in this area under Colonel Wade and his successors until 1845. At time of the outbreak of the first Anglo-Sikh War (December 1845), he was a political agent in the state of Bahawalpur.

Upon the commencement of the conflict, he was attached first to the staff of Sir Charles Napier and then to that of Sir Hugh Gough, Commander-in-chief in India. He was present, as political officer, with the division of Sir Harry Smith at the battles of Buddawal (22 January 1846) and Aliwal (28 January 1846). At Sobraon (10 February 1846), he served as an additional aide-de-camp to the Governor-General, Sir Henry Hardinge. His services earned him a brevet and the appointment of political agent to the state of Bhopal from 1846 to 1850.

He published History of the Sikhs in 1849. The second edition of the book was published in 1853 after the death of Cunningham by his brother Peter Cunningham. The book was noted for Cunningham's criticism of Sir Henry Hardinge's management of the Anglo-Sikh War and which then brought about his dismissal from political service since the views expressed in this work were anything but pleasing to his superiors. As a punishment, he was removed from his political appointment and sent back to regimental duty. The disgrace is reported to have hastened his death, and soon after his appointment to the Meerut Division of Public Works, he died at the city of Ambala, Punjab in 1851. His grave is still there in Ambala Christian cemetery.

Publications

References

External links

1812 births
1851 deaths
19th-century Scottish historians
Bengal Engineers officers
Historians of India